DWJR (96.1 FM), braoadcasting as 96.1 Farm Radio, is radio station owned by Rinconada Broadcasting Corporation and operated by Farm Expression Broadcasting. The station's studio is located at Brgy. San Antonio, Calabanga.

References

Radio stations established in 2015
Radio stations in Naga, Camarines Sur